The 1999 Bayelsa State gubernatorial election occurred in Nigeria on January 9, 1999. The PDP nominee Diepreye Alamieyeseigha won the election, defeating the APP candidate, Francis Doukpola, and two others to become Bayelsa State's first elected governor.

Diepreye Alamieyeseigha won the PDP nomination at the primary election. He picked Goodluck Jonathan as his running mate.

Electoral system
The Governor of Bayelsa State is elected using the plurality voting system.

Results
PDP's DSP Alamieyesiegha emerged winner in the contest.

The total number of registered voters in the state for the election was 873,000. However, 897,500 were previously issued voting cards in the state.

References 

Bayelsa State gubernatorial elections
Bayelsa State
Bayelsa State gubernatorial election
gubernatorial